Gary Hasler (born 5 May 1970) is an Australian former association football player. he played in the National Soccer League for Sunshine George Cross and South Melbourne. In international football, he made two appearances for Australia and also represented the country at the 1992 Olympics.

Playing career

Club career
Hasler joined Sunshine George Cross in the National Soccer League in 1989.

In 1992, he joined South Melbourne. After two seasons he moved to Heidelberg in the Victorian Premier League.

International career
Hasler was a member of the Australian squad at the 1992 Barcelona Olympics.

In September 1992 he played twice for Australia in full internationals. His debut for Australia was against Tahiti in Papeete. His second and final match was against Solomon Islands later in the same month.

References

1970 births
Living people
Australian soccer players
Australia international soccer players
Olympic soccer players of Australia
Footballers at the 1992 Summer Olympics
National Soccer League (Australia) players
Association football midfielders
Caroline Springs George Cross FC players
South Melbourne FC players
Heidelberg United FC players